Margaret Annice Stone (July 23, 1919 – May 27, 2001), later known by her married name Margaret Donato, was a Canadian freestyle swimmer who competed in the 1936 Summer Olympics in Berlin, Germany.  She was a member of the Canadian relay team which finished fourth in the women's 4x100-metre freestyle relay.  In the women's 100-metre freestyle, she was eliminated in the semi-finals.

External links

Margaret Stone's profile at Sports Reference.com

1919 births
2001 deaths
Canadian female freestyle swimmers
Olympic swimmers of Canada
Swimmers at the 1936 Summer Olympics